TEDOM Kronos 122 is a low-floor intercity bus produced by now defunct bus manufacturing division of the company TEDOM from the Czech Republic in 2006, when it was replaced by TEDOM L 12.

Construction features 
The Kronos 122 is a low-floor bus (floor height 340 mm above the ground). Frame chassis is welded thin-walled hollow sections of stainless steel. The cladding is formed from aluminum sheet faces the vehicle and the roof is made of fiberglass.

Production and operation 
Two buses were made in 2006 and the company TEDOM doesn't produce buses anymore.

See also

External links
 List of buses

Buses of the Czech Republic
Buses manufactured by TEDOM
Low-floor buses